Albertus Jacobus de Swardt (born  in George, South Africa) is a former South African rugby union player, whose regular playing position was hooker.

He retired at the start of 2016, aged 25.

Rugby career

He then moved to Italian National Championship of Excellence team L'Aquila for a short spell in 2012.

He returned to South Africa in 2013 to join  on a two-year deal.

He also played for the  team that reached the semi-finals of the Varsity Cup.

In 2014, he was selected on the bench for the  side to face  during a tour match during a 2014 incoming tour. He came on as a late substitute, played the last eight minutes as the Kings suffered a 12–34 defeat.

A hamstring injury sustained in 2011 caused De Swart several hip and groin issues in later years and he retired at the start of 2016 on medical advice.

Statistics

References

South African rugby union players
Eastern Province Elephants players
Western Province (rugby union) players
People from George, South Africa
Living people
1990 births
Rugby union hookers
Rugby union players from the Western Cape